Novosibirsk Chemical Concentrates Plant is a company based in Novosibirsk, Russia. It is part of TVEL (Rosatom group).

The Novosibirsk Chemical Concentrates Plant (Khimkontsentrat) is a nuclear-related facility involved in the processing of uranium and other materials, and in reactor fuel fabrication.

References

External links
 Official website

Manufacturing companies based in Novosibirsk
Kalininsky City District, Novosibirsk
Rosatom
Ministry of Medium Machine Building
Manufacturing companies of the Soviet Union